Elin Bergkvist (born 21 January 1994) is a Swedish football defender currently playing for IF Brommapojkarna in the Elitettan.

References

External links
 Piteå player profile  
 Damallsvenskan player profile 

1994 births
Living people
Swedish women's footballers
Damallsvenskan players
Piteå IF (women) players
Women's association football defenders
Sunnanå SK players
IFK Kalmar players
Elitettan players